The Ural-375 is a general purpose 4.5 ton 6×6 truck, which has been produced at the Ural Automotive Plant in the Russian SFSR since 1961. The Ural-375 replaced the  ZIL-157 as the standard Soviet Army truck in 1979. It was itself replaced by the Ural-4320.

The Ural-375 was used, for example, as a platform for the BM-21 Grad rocket launcher, as a troop carrier, and as a supply carrier.

Models

The Ural-375 comes in a variety of models (the list is not exhaustive):

Ural-375, the base model. It has a canvas roof, and no steel cabin
Ural-375A, a slightly longer model
Ural-375D, the most produced 375; it has a proper all-steel cabin
Ural-375E KET-L, a recovery vehicle equipped a front-mounted and a rear-mounted winch along with a jib crane.  
Ural-375S, a 6×6 tractor
Ural-377, a civilian 6×4 truck
Ural-377S, a 6×4 tractor
Ural-375DM, modernized version of the Ural-375D, built at least until 1991

Specifications

Conventional cab, 3 seats
Payload: 4800 kg (10,580 lb)
Max. permissible mass: 13,200 kg (29,100 lb)
Suspension: live beam axles, leaf springs
Engine:  (GOST) ZIL-375Ya 7.0-litre V8 petrol (carburetor) pushrod engine
Gearbox: 5×2-speed gearbox
Max. speed: 
Brakes: Pneumatic drum brakes
Fording depth: 1500 mm (59 in)
Dimensions: L×W×H = 7350 × 2690 × 2980 mm (289.4 × 105.9 × 117.3 in); includes tarpaulin
Track width: 2000 mm (78.7 in)
Turning circle: 22,000 mm (866 in)
Ground Clearance: 400 mm (15.7 in)
Tires: , pressure 
Fuel tank: 
Fuel economy:

Users

: Received Ural-375D's during 1970s.

: Only specialized variants in use.
  - 4000+ in active service over 10,000 in storage most in need of overhaul.

 Transnistria

Former users
: Passed into successor states.
: All destroyed or retired since 2003.
: All destroyed or retired, only one known in conservation in poor shape.
: Passed into successor states.

See also
Ural-5323
Russian Ground Forces

References

External links

 Official website GAZ Group Ural

Ural Automotive Plant trucks
Military trucks of the Soviet Union
Military vehicles introduced in the 1960s